The 1932 World Table Tennis Championships mixed doubles was the sixth edition of the mixed doubles championship.  

Viktor Barna and Anna Sipos defeated Miklós Szabados and Mária Mednyánszky in the final by three sets to nil.

Results

See also
 List of World Table Tennis Championships medalists

References

-